Salvia mairei is a perennial plant that is native to Yunnan province in China.

Notes

mairei
Flora of China